Magnus Jernemyr (born 18 July 1976) is a Swedish handballer who last played for GWD Minden and the Swedish national team. In 2012, he was selected as Liga ASOBAL's best defender.  In that year, he was also part of the Swedish team that won the silver medal at the Olympic Games.

References

External links
 FCB profile

1976 births
Living people
Swedish male handball players
Swedish expatriate sportspeople in Spain
Liga ASOBAL players
FC Barcelona Handbol players
CB Torrevieja players
Handball players at the 2012 Summer Olympics
Olympic handball players of Sweden
Olympic silver medalists for Sweden
Olympic medalists in handball
Medalists at the 2012 Summer Olympics
Lugi HF players
Redbergslids IK players
Sportspeople from Uppsala